Tomasz Konecki (born 22 April 1962 in Warsaw) is a Polish film director.

A graduate of Warsaw University, he worked with TVP1. He has directed six films including Testosteron and Lejdis.

Filmography

Director
 Pół serio (2000)
 Ciało (2003)
 Tango z aniołem (2005-2006)
 Testosteron (2007)
 Lejdis (2007)
 The Perfect Guy for My Girl (Polish: Idealny facet dla mojej dziewczyny) (2009)

Actor
 Pół serio (2000)

External links
 Tomasz Konecki at onet.pl
 Tomasz Konecki at filmweb.pl

Polish film directors
1962 births
Living people
Film people from Warsaw